Sunburn is a condition of the skin after overexposure to ultraviolet radiation.

Sunburn may also refer to:
 Sun scald, the effects of ultraviolet radiation on the plant kingdom
 SS-N-22 Sunburn, two Soviet anti-ship missiles
 Sunburn (Sun album), 1978
 Sunburn (Blake Babies album), 1990
 Sunburn (Fuel album), 1998
 "Sunburn" (Fuel song), 1999
 "Sunburn" (Muse song), 2000
 Sunburn (Owl City song)
 Sunburn, a 2004 album by Gordie Sampson
 Sunburn (1979 film), a film starring Farrah Fawcett
 Sunburn (1999 film), an American film
 Sunburn (TV series), a BBC series starring Michelle Collins and Sean Maguire
 Sunburn, a fictional female Transformers character
 Sunburn Festival, an electronic dance music festival held in Candolim Beach, Goa, India
 "Sunburn", a song by Tinashe from Nightride
 Sunburn (Skylander), a playable character in the video game series Skylanders